The Quota is the third album by saxophonist Jimmy Heath featuring performances recorded in 1961 originally released on the Riverside label.

Reception

The contemporaneous DownBeat reviewer, Leonard Feather, concluded: "All in all, a session that didn't aim too high and managed to hit the target." Stephen Cook of AllMusic says, "Jimmy Heath's considerable talents are very evident on this fine hard bop title... The Quota'''s strong material, tight arrangements, and thoughtful solos help make this Heath title one of the better hard bop releases available and a must for any jazz collection".

Track listingAll compositions by Jimmy Heath except as indicated''
 "The Quota" - 5:08  
 "Lowland Lullaby" - 4:38  
 "Thinking of You" (Harry Ruby, Bert Kalmar) - 5:08  
 "Bells and Horns" (Milt Jackson) - 4:55  
 "Down Shift" - 5:47  
 "When Sunny Gets Blue" (Marvin Fisher, Jack Segal) - 6:29  
 "Funny Time" - 6:23

Personnel
Jimmy Heath - tenor saxophone
Freddie Hubbard - trumpet
Julius Watkins - French horn 
Cedar Walton - piano
Percy Heath - bass
Albert Heath - drums

References

Riverside Records albums
Jimmy Heath albums
1961 albums
Albums produced by Orrin Keepnews